John Charles Floyd (April 14, 1858 – November 4, 1930) was an American politician and a U.S. Representative from Arkansas.

Biography
Born in Sparta, Tennessee, Floyd was the son of John Wesley and Eliza Jane Snodgrass Floyd. He moved to Benton County, Arkansas, in 1869 with his parents, who settled near Bentonville. He attended the common and high schools, and was graduated from the Arkansas Industrial University (later the University of Arkansas) at Fayetteville in 1879. In November 1887, he married Virginia Berry, and they had three children, Nina B., Rector H., and James Berry.

Career
Floyd taught school at Springdale, Arkansas, in 1880 and 1881, and studied law. He was admitted to the bar in 1882 and commenced practice in Yellville, Arkansas. He served in the Arkansas House of Representatives from 1889 to 1891, and was prosecuting attorney of the fourteenth judicial circuit from 1890 to 1894.

Elected as a Democrat to the Fifty-ninth and to the four succeeding Congresses, Floyd served from March 4, 1905 to March 3, 1915.  He was one of the managers appointed by the House of Representatives in 1912 to conduct the impeachment proceedings against Robert W. Archbald, judge of the United States Commerce Court. Not a candidate for renomination in 1914, he resumed the practice of law in Yellville, Arkansas. He was an unsuccessful candidate for nomination as Governor of Arkansas in 1920.

Death
Floyd died in Yellville, Arkansas, on November 4, 1930 (age 72 years, 204 days). He is interred at Layton Cemetery, Yellville, Arkansas.

References

External links

1858 births
1930 deaths
People from Sparta, Tennessee
American people of Welsh descent
Democratic Party members of the Arkansas House of Representatives
People from Benton County, Arkansas
Arkansas lawyers
University of Arkansas alumni
People from Springdale, Arkansas
Democratic Party members of the United States House of Representatives from Arkansas